Black Diamond is the fourth studio album by the American singer-songwriter Stan Ridgway, released in 1996.

Production
"As I Went Out One Morning" is a cover of the Bob Dylan song. "Luther Played Guitar" is about the guitar player Luther Perkins. "Gone the Distance" addresses the death of Kurt Cobain.

Critical reception
The Washington Post determined that "the Dylan tune is one indication that Ridgway wants to be taken seriously, and he does tone down his arch vocal style on some of these songs." The Boston Globe wrote that the album, "though quieter and more spare than much of Ridgway's work, continues his pattern of writing moody story-songs, restless character studies imbued with dark, spooky undertones."

Track listing

Personnel
Adapted from the Black Diamond liner notes.
Musicians
Stan Ridgway – lead vocals, acoustic guitar, electric guitar, harmonica, recorder, Hammond organ, production
Ted Andersen – drums, percussion
Harlan Boddicker – bass guitar
Larry Grennan – recording, mixing, percussion, backing vocals
Bob Elmo – cello, violin, bass guitar
Todd Sharp – saxophone, woodwind
Pietra Wexstun – keyboards, backing vocals

Production and additional personnel
Ed Colver – photography
Fred Davis – design
Doug Schwartz – mastering

Release history

References

External links 
 

1996 albums
Stan Ridgway albums
Albums produced by Stan Ridgway
Birdcage Records albums